Vladimir Brčkov  (born December 29, 1989) is a Macedonian professional basketball player. He plays for Borec of Macedonian Second League. He is also a member of the Macedonian national basketball team.

Macedonian national team
Brckov is also a member of the North Macedonia men's national basketball team.  He competed with the team at Eurobasket 2013.

References

External links
 eurobasket.com
 basketball.realgm.com

Living people
1989 births
Macedonian men's basketball players
Small forwards
Sportspeople from Veles, North Macedonia